Germán Briceño (born 13 August 1919) was a Venezuelan sports shooter. He competed in the 100 metre running deer event at the 1956 Summer Olympics.

He is the brother of fellow Venezuelan shooter Humberto Briceño.

References

External links
 

1919 births
Possibly living people
Venezuelan male sport shooters
Olympic shooters of Venezuela
Shooters at the 1956 Summer Olympics
Place of birth missing (living people)